Arsenal Hill may refer to:

Arsenal Hill (Dealul Spirii), Bucharest, Romania
Arsenal Hill (Columbia), South Carolina, United States